Kabadüz is a town and district of Ordu Province in the Black Sea region of Turkey. According to the 2000 census, population of the district is 11,049 of which 4,018 live in the town of Kabadüz.

Kabadüz is a district of green hillsides, 21 km inland from the city of Ordu. The villages of Kabadüz district include Akgüney, Derinçay, Dişkaya, Esenyurt, Gelinkaya, Gülpınar, Gümüşdere, Harami, Karakiraz, Kirazdere, Özlükent, and Yeşilada.

Notes

References

External links
 District governor's official website 
 Road map of Kabadüz and environs
 Detailed road map of Kabadüz district
 Various images of Kabadüz, Ordu

Populated places in Ordu Province
Districts of Ordu Province